María Isabel Pérez Torres (born 7 September 1992) is a Cuban footballer who plays as a midfielder for the Cuba women's national team.

External links 
 

1992 births
Living people
Cuban women's footballers
Women's association football midfielders
FC Camagüey players
Cuba women's international footballers
21st-century Cuban women